Clypeoceriospora is a fungal genus in the class Sordariomycetes. The relationship of this taxon to other taxa within the class is unknown (incertae sedis). A monotypic genus, Clypeoceriospora contains the single species Clypeoceriospora rubi, described as new to science in 1946.

References

Monotypic Sordariomycetes genera
Sordariomycetes enigmatic taxa